The Joseph Chandler House, built c. 1800, is the oldest house in Centreville, New Castle County, Delaware.  Centreville developed along the Kennett Pike (Delaware Route 52) starting about 1811, with its houses facing toward the pike.  Nevertheless, the Chandler house faces south, away from the pike.

Dr.  Joseph P.  Chandler, who built the house, used it as a residence and an office.  The house was later acquired by the  Gregg,  Carpenter and du Pont  families. William S. Potter bought the house in 1935 and added brick and stone wings to the original stone house.

The house was listed by the National Register of Historic Places in 1983, at the same time the nearby Centreville Historic District, Mt. Airy School No. 27, and Carpenter-Lippincott House were also listed.

References

Houses completed in 1800
Houses on the National Register of Historic Places in Delaware
Georgian architecture in Delaware
Houses in New Castle County, Delaware
National Register of Historic Places in New Castle County, Delaware